Marko Brekalo (born 24 November 1992) is a Croatian professional footballer who plays as a forward for NK Lučko.

Club career
In his career Brekalo played mainly in Croatia for teams such as: Lokomotiva, Dubrava, HNK Gorica, Cibalia or Šibenik, among others, but he also played in Austria and Slovenia for Floridsdorfer AC and Krka. NK Krka.

References

External links
 
 
 

1992 births
Living people
Footballers from Zagreb
Association football forwards
Croatian footballers
NK Lokomotiva Zagreb players
NK Dubrava players
HNK Gorica players
NK Zelina players
NK Vrapče players
Floridsdorfer AC players
NK Lučko players
NK Krka players
HNK Cibalia players
HNK Šibenik players
FC Botoșani players
NK Hrvatski Dragovoljac players
Croatian Football League players
First Football League (Croatia) players
2. Liga (Austria) players
Slovenian Second League players
Liga I players
Croatian expatriate footballers
Croatian expatriate sportspeople in Austria
Expatriate footballers in Austria
Croatian expatriate sportspeople in Slovenia
Expatriate footballers in Slovenia
Croatian expatriate sportspeople in Romania
Expatriate footballers in Romania